Nick Moran (born 23 December 1968 or 1969, sources differ) is an English actor and filmmaker, best known for his role as Eddie the card sharp in Lock, Stock and Two Smoking Barrels. He appeared as Scabior in Harry Potter and the Deathly Hallows – Part 1 and Part 2.

Early life 
Moran was born in the East End of London, to a hairdresser mother and an Automobile Association worker father. He grew up on the South Oxhey council estate near Watford and the Greater London boundary.

Career

Film 
Moran's first hit film appearance was in 1990 alongside Roger Daltrey and Chesney Hawkes, in Buddy's Song (1990). His first lead role was later that year, in Vera Neubauer's Don't Be Afraid (1990). He then went on to star with Britpack waifs Hans Matheson and Samantha Morton in a Coky Giedroyc short, The Future Lasts a Long Time (1996). In Lock, Stock and Two Smoking Barrels (1998), he shared the screen with Jason Statham, Dexter Fletcher, Jason Flemyng, Vinnie Jones and British singer Sting, who played the role of his father, JD.

Moran co-starred with John Hurt in New Blood (1999), and also starred with Joseph Fiennes, Sadie Frost and Tara FitzGerald in Rancid Aluminium (2000). In 2001, he played the role of Aramis in The Musketeer, a film loosely based on Alexandre Dumas, père's classic novel, The Three Musketeers. The film co-starred Catherine Deneuve, Tim Roth, Mena Suvari, Stephen Rea and Bill Treacher, with Justin Chambers in the role of D'Artagnan.

After his directorial début in Telstar, Moran went on to film The Kid, an adaptation of Kevin Lewis's book of the same name. The film was released in 2010 and stars Rupert Friend, Ioan Gruffudd, Natascha McElhone and Liam Cunningham.

He appeared as Scabior, a snatcher in Fenrir Greyback's gang, in Harry Potter and the Deathly Hallows – Part 1 and Part 2.

Stage 
Moran has also made a number of stage appearances; his first job was understudying the lead in Blood Brothers in London's West End. He was in the original cast of Nick Grosso's Real Classy Affair at the Royal Court Theatre. Subsequent appearances include Paul Webb's Four Nights in Knaresborough, Look Back in Anger both in 2001, Alfie in 2003, The Countess in 2005, and from November 2013 until March 2014, as 'Juror 7' in Twelve Angry Men at the Garrick Theatre.

Moran co-wrote the play Telstar with James Hicks. It is a dramatisation of the life of Joe Meek, one of Britain's early independent record producers, who had a massive worldwide hit with the Tornados' 1962 Telstar single.

The play was directed by Paul Jepson and was staged at the New Ambassadors Theatre, London, from 21 June to 12 September 2005. This was the play's West End début after a successful small-scale National Tour that featured stars such as Linda Robson, Adam Rickitt and Con O'Neill.

A screen adaptation of the play, directed by Moran, was released in 2009. Con O'Neill reprised his stage role as Meek; Kevin Spacey played his financier, Major Banks.

Moran also starred in the lead role of 'Roaring Trade' at Park Theatre in October 2015.

Personal life 
Moran fronts his own Frank Sinatra tribute band, often appearing at London's Café de Paris and various charity events.

In Moran's spare time, he practises karate.

Filmography

Feature films 
 Hard Days, Hard Nights (1989) – Rick
 Buddy's Song (1990) – Mike
 The Future Lasts a Long Time (1996) – Matt
 Clancy's Kitchen (1996) – Ivan
 Miss Monday (1998) – Jeremy
 Lock, Stock and Two Smoking Barrels (1998) – Eddie
 The Rules of Engagement (1999) – Jimmy
 New Blood (1999) – Danny White
 Star! Star! (1999) – Anatol
 Rancid Aluminium (2000) – Harry the dealer
 Christie Malry's Own Double-Entry (2000) – Christie Malry
 The Proposal (2001) – Terry Martin
 Another Life (2001) – Percy Thompson
 The Musketeer (2001) – Aramis
 White Bits (2002) – Dave
 Ant Muzak (2002) – Goddard
 Ashes and Sand (2002) – Daniel
 Ten Minutes (2003) – Andy
 Noise Control (2003) – The Pilot (RAF Fighter jet pilot)
 Chaos and Cadavers (2003) – Edward Taggert
 The Baby Juice Express (2004) – Des
 Spivs (2004) – Steve
 Soccer Dog: European Cup (2004) – Bryan MacGreggor
 American Daylight (2004) – Lawrence Stokowski
 The Last Drop (2005) – Pvt Alan Ives
 Silent Partner (2005) – Gordon Patrick
 Puritan (2005) – Simon Puritan
 The Pistachio Nut (2005) – Peter Hall
 The Amazing Grace (2006) – John Newton
 Clubbing to Death (2007) – Mark
 Prisoners of the Sun (2007) – Adam Prime
 Telstar: The Joe Meek Story (2008) – Alex Meek (also writer and director)
 Goal III: Taking on the World (2009) – Nick Ashworth
 Harry Potter and the Deathly Hallows – Part 1 (2010) – Scabior
 Harry Potter and the Deathly Hallows – Part 2 (2011) – Scabior
 Age of Kill (2015) – Roy Dixon
 My Name Is Lenny (2017) – Johnny Bootnose
 London Heist (2017) – DCI Wickstead
 Accident Man (2018) – Leonard Kent
 Terminal (2018) – Illing
 Avengement (2019) – Hyde
 Nemesis (2021) – Frank Conway
 Creation Stories (2021) – Director
Renegades (2022) – Burton

Television 
 Heartbeat – "Keep on Running" (1992) Rick Parker
 Eldorado (1992) – Jim
 Casualty – "Money Talks" (1992) Jez
 The Bill – "A Bitter Pill" (1997) Paul Shea / "Picking Up the Pieces" (1995) Todd Grant / "In Broad Daylight" (1993) Dean Stacey
 Midsomer Murders – "Blood Will Out" (1999) Michael Smith
 CI5: The New Professionals – "Miss Hit" (1999) Tony Radelli
 Born to Shine (2011)
 Mr Selfridge (2012) – Reg Towler
 The Wrong Mans – Stevens
 By Any Means – Jamie Caine
 The Great Train Robbery – Jack Slipper
 Death in Paradise (2015) – Pete Thunders
 Babs (2017) – John Deeks
 Celebrity MasterChef (2017) – Contestant
 Inside No. 9 – "Once Removed" (2018) Spike
 Shakespeare & Hathaway: Private Investigators – "This Rough Magic" (2018) Steffan Shiplake
 Richard Osman's House of Games (2022)

References

External links 
 
 http://www.musicomh.com/theatre/telstar.htm "Telstar" – The play

1968 births
Living people
Male actors from London
Alumni of the Mountview Academy of Theatre Arts
English male television actors
English male film actors
English male stage actors
English male radio actors
English male voice actors
English male musical theatre actors
Audiobook narrators
British male karateka
English dramatists and playwrights
English screenwriters
English male screenwriters
English television directors
English film directors
20th-century English male actors
21st-century English male actors
English male dramatists and playwrights